Minangkabau (Minangkabau: ,; ;  or ,) is an Austronesian language spoken by the Minangkabau of West Sumatra, the western part of Riau, South Aceh Regency, the northern part of Bengkulu and Jambi, also in several cities throughout Indonesia by migrated Minangkabau. The language is also a lingua franca along the western coastal region of the province of North Sumatra, and is even used in parts of Aceh, where the language is called Aneuk Jamee. 

Due to the huge proximity between Minangkabau and Malay, there is some controversy regarding the relationship between the two. Some see Minangkabau as an early variety of Malay, while others think of Minangkabau as a distinct (Malayic) language.

Minangkabau is one of a few languages that generally lacks verb forms and grammatical subject-object distinctions.

Geographic distribution
Minangkabau is the native language of the Minangkabau people of West Sumatra. There are approximately 5.5 million speakers of the language. It is also spoken in the western part of Riau, South Aceh Regency, the northern part of Bengkulu and Jambi. Along the western coastal region of North Sumatra, the language is also a lingua franca. The language is used and called Aneuk Jamee in parts of Aceh.

Besides Indonesia, Minangkabau is also spoken in Malaysia, by some descendants of migrants from the Minang-speaking region in Sumatra (Ranah Minang, Tanah Minang, or Land of the Minang). Significant numbers of the early migrants settled in what is now the Malaysian state of Negeri Sembilan; this Negeri Sembilan Malay, known as Bahaso Nogori / Baso Nogoghi, is now a distinct language, more closely related to Malay than to Minangkabau. More recent immigrants are known as Minang.

Dialects 
The Minangkabau language has several dialects, sometimes differing between nearby villages (e.g. separated by a river). The dialects are Rao Mapat Tunggul, Muaro Sungai Lolo, Payakumbuh, Pangkalan-Lubuk Alai, Agam-Tanah Datar, Pancungsoal, Kotobaru, Sungai Bendung Air, and Karanganyar. In everyday communication between Minangkabau people of different regions, the Agam-Tanah Datar dialect (Baso Padang or Baso Urang Awak 'our [people's] language') is often used and has become a kind of standard.

The Tapan language, spoken in the town of Tapan in southern West Sumatra province, is a recently discovered Malayan language which has been proposed as related to but not part of Minangkabau. Together, Tapan and Minangkabau would form a Greater Minangkabau subgroup. The two languages Tapan and Muko-Muko form a Lunangic subgroup within the Minangic (Greater Minangkabau) language group.

The Minangic subgroup is characterized by the following word-final sound changes.
 *V[hi]ŋ > V[hi]ăŋ
 *us > uĭh
 *at > eʔ
 *as > eh
 *is > ih

Phonology 
The sound inventory of Minangkabau is listed below:

Example

Sentences

Numerals

See also 

 Minangkabau people
 Overseas Minangkabau

References

Further reading 
 Nurlela Adnan, Ermitati, Rosnida M. Nur, Pusat Bahasa (Indonesia), Balai Pustaka (Persero), PT. 2001 - Indonesian-Minangkabau dictionary (Kamus bahasa Indonesia-Minangkabau), 841 pages.
Marjusman Maksan, Yulina Kasim, Tamsin Medan, Syamsir Arifin, Basri, A. Razak Sikumbang, 1984, Geografi Dialek Bahasa Minangbakau, Jakarta, Pusat Pembinaan Dan Pengembangan Bahasa Departemen Pendidikan Dan Kebudayaan, 1984.
 Tata Bahasa Minangkabau, Gerard Moussay (original title La Langue Minangkabau, translated from French by Rahayu S. Hidayat), .

External links 

 Rosetta Project: Minangkabau Swadesh List

 
Agglutinative languages
Languages of Indonesia
Languages of Malaysia
Minangkabau
Malayic languages
Languages of Sumatra
Languages of Aceh